The Leuser Range or   Leuser Massif, known as  Mount Leuser is a group of three peaks, is the highest mountain in the Indonesian province of Aceh. The range lies to the south and west of the Alas River that flows east from the highlands of central Aceh before turning south through Karo Batak country in North Sumatra province. The Leuser region is of ancient uplifted formations - it is non-volcanic. The region is billed as the largest wilderness area in South-East Asia. 
It is often assumed, incorrectly, that the highest peak is Mount Leuser when in fact it is Mount Tanpa Nama. Mount Leuser is the lowest of the three peaks.

Peaks on the Leuser Range 

BAKOSURTANAL, the Indonesian Survey and Mapping Agency, provides the names and locations of Loser and Leuser on their topographical maps. The Gunung Leuser National Park (GLNP) authorities have adopted these names and their locations.

The altitude, coordinates and prominence of the three summits are:
 Tanpa Nama (true summit)): 3,466 m (11,317 ft); 3.7976 N (3°47'5"N), 97.1218 E (97°13’9”E); prominence 2,941 m (9,649 ft)
 Loser: 3,404 m (11,178 ft); 3.7567 N (3°45'24"N), 97.173 E (97°10’24”E); prominence 319 m (1,047 ft)
 Leuser: 3,119 m (10,348 ft); 3.7413 N (3°44'29"N), 97.1551 E (97°9’18”E); prominence 107 m (351 ft)

Mount Tanpa Nama 

Mount Tanpa Nama, 3,466 m (11,317 ft), which in Indonesian means "nameless mountain", is the second highest peak in Sumatra after Mount Kerinci (3,805 m, 12,484 ft). The peak lies inland from the escarpment, is easy to climb, and has views in all directions. The mountain has two knolls: a painted sign on the lower knoll (3,455 m, 11,335 ft) reads “Puncak Tanpa Nama” (summit of Mount Tanpa Nama). On the higher, more prominent knoll to the north-east, the true summit, a plaque embedded in a cement block reads, “Prof Dr Syamsuddin Mahmud, Governor Aceh, 1997 ...”.

The name, Mount Tanpa Nama, is used in the absence of a formally recognised name. BAKOSURTANAL does not attribute a name to this peak on its 1977 map series; only the altitude of the lower knoll is indicated. A formal name may appear if and when BASKOSURTANAL issues new topographical maps of Sumatra.

Mounts Loser and Leuser 

Mounts Loser and Leuser, by comparison with Mount Tanpa Nama, rise from the east with precipitous drop-offs on their western faces over the rugged escarpment towards the west coast of Aceh. Most trekkers set Mount Loser as their objective being the higher and more accessible of the two peaks.

The origin of the names, Loser and Leuser, are obscure. One source informs that Leuser is a Gayo word meaning “place where animals go to die”. Local folk lore provides a not-unrelated story: a Dutch officer was hunting deer on the Leuser Range in colonial times and accidentally shot his hunting partner on the Loser peak. The porters, accompanying the party, used the Gayo word, los, meaning “dead”, to describe the fate of the partner.

References

Leuser
Landforms of Aceh